Kayonza is a district (akarere) located in Eastern Province, Rwanda. Its capital is Mukarange.The population of Kayonza District is projected to 344,157 people in 2012, living in 12 sectors (imirenge): Gahini, Kabare, Kabarondo, Mukarange, Murama, Murundi, Mwiri, Ndego, Nyamirama, Rukara, Ruramira and Rwinkwavu.,  and 50 cells and 421 Villages (Imidugudu).

Akagera National Park 
Kayonza is the home of Akagera National Park, a popular tourist destination for safaris. Since the import of 7 lions in 2015, from the Phinda Game Reserve and Tembe Elephant Park, in South Africa, Akagera is home to all of the 'Big Five' animals. As of 2019, there are around  25 lions.

Banks 
 KCB BANK RWANDA LTD Kayonza Branch
 BANK OF KIGALI LTD Kayonza Branch
 BPR Part of Atlas Mara Kayonza
 GT BANK RWANDA LTD Kayonza

Hotels and Motels 
 Elegancia Hotel
 Eastern Country Hotel
 Silent Hill Hotel
 Midland Motel
 Eastland Motel 
 Savanna Motel
 Jambo Beach Motel
 Imbuto zamahoro

Healthcare Facilities 
 NARADA MEDICAL CLINIC
 GAHINI HOSPITAL

References

External links 
 
 Kayonza District government website

Districts of Rwanda